Love & Money is an American sitcom television series created by Rob Long and Dan Staley, that aired from CBS on October 8, 1999 to July 18, 2000. Aired and unaired episodes later aired on HDNet.

Premise
On the day of her wedding, the eldest daughter of the wealthy Conklin family, Allison, has misgivings about the marriage's success. She locks herself in the bathroom but tells her family that the door is stuck. Her mother, Effie, calls for the building's superintendent, Eamon McBride, to fix the door. After getting into the bathroom, it's revealed that Eamon and Allison are former lovers, which reignites the dwindling flame of their love. Allison's father, Nicholas, doesn't approve of the relationship and even attempts to bribe Eamon into leaving Allison alone. However, Allison decides to follow her heart, regardless of what her family thinks. The show focuses on the development of the relationship and how the wealthy Conklin family get used to Eamon's father, Finn, who works as the building's doorman. The Conklins live in a mansions occupying the top three floors of the building and the McBride's reside in a small basement apartment.

Cast
Brian Van Holt as Eamon McBride
Paget Brewster as Allison Conklin
Brian Doyle-Murray as Finn McBride
John Livingston as Nicky Conklin
Judy Greer as Puff Conklin
Swoosie Kurtz as Effie Conklin
David Ogden Stiers as Nicholas Conklin

In a podcast interview with Ken Levine, creator Rob Long indicated that Frank Langella was initially cast as Nicholas Conklin, but was fired after the run-through of the pilot episode over creative differences regarding the character's prominence among the ensemble.

Episodes

References

External links

1999 American television series debuts
2000 American television series endings
1990s American sitcoms
2000s American sitcoms
English-language television shows
CBS original programming
Television shows set in New York City
Television series by CBS Studios